Johann George II (31 May 1613 – 22 August 1680) was the Elector of Saxony from 1656 to 1680. He belonged to the Albertine line of the House of Wettin.

Biography

He was the third (fourth in order of birth) but eldest surviving son of the Elector Johann George I, Elector of Saxony and Magdalene Sybille of Prussia, his second spouse. He succeeded his father as Elector of Saxony when John George I died on 8 October 1656.

In 1657 John George made an arrangement with his three brothers with the object of preventing disputes over their separate territories, and in 1664 he entered into friendly relations with Louis XIV. He received money from the French king, but the existence of a strong anti-French party in Saxony induced him occasionally to respond to the overtures of the emperor Leopold I.

The elector's primary interests were not in politics, but in music and art. He adorned Dresden, which under him became the musical centre of Germany; welcoming foreign musicians and others he gathered around him a large and splendid court, and his capital was the constant scene of musical and other festivals. He commissioned the building of the first opera house, the Opernhaus am Taschenberg.

In 1658 John George was accepted into the Fruitbearing Society, through the patronage of Duke William of Saxe-Weimar.

His enormous expenditure on the arts compelled John George in 1661 to grant greater control over monetary matters to the estates, a step which laid the foundation of the later system of finance in Saxony. Also, his government was less effective in establishing absolutist rule and a standing army than were Bohemia or Prussia.

John George's reign saw the slow economic reconstruction of Saxony after the Thirty Years' War. New trades and manufactures developed, such as textiles, hard coal and glass. Locally mined silver filled the Electorate's empty treasury, and the Leipzig Trade Fair and the Bohemian Exulanten of 1654 also stimulated economic activity.

John George died in Freiberg on 22 August 1680.

Family
In Dresden on 13 November 1638 John George married Magdalene Sibylle of Brandenburg-Bayreuth. They had three children:

Sibylle Marie (16 September 1642 – 27 February 1643)
Erdmuthe Sophie (25 February 1644 – 22 June 1670), married on 29 October 1662 to Christian Ernst, Margrave of Brandenburg-Bayreuth
John George III (20 June 1647 –  12 September 1691), his successor as Elector.

Ancestors

See also
 List of famous big game hunters

Notes

References
 Mary E. Frandsen: Crossing Confessional Boundaries. The Patronage of Italian Sacred Music in 17th Century Dresden.  New York: Oxford University Press, 2006.  

Attribution

Prince-electors of Saxony
House of Wettin
Knights of the Garter
1613 births
1680 deaths
Nobility from Dresden
Imperial vicars
Electoral Princes of Saxony
Albertine branch
Burials at Freiberg Cathedral